June Cross is an American documentary film director and producer.

Life and career
Cross was born in New York City. She is the daughter of James Cross, half of the vaudeville team of Stump and Stumpy and Norma Booth, an actor. She is the stepdaughter of comedian and actor Larry Storch; and her half sister is the actor Lynda Gravatt. She attended public school in Atlantic City, New Jersey, and graduated from Atlantic City High School in 1971. She attended Harvard- Radcliffe College, and graduated in 1975.

Cross started her career as a copygirl  at The Press of Atlantic City while still in college. After graduation, she got a job at WGBH-TV for the broadcast Say Brother. She moved to New York City to take a job as a reporter at the  PBS NewsHour in 1979, and eventually became a Producer/Correspondent there. Her work covering the Grenada Invasion won a 1983  News & Documentary Emmy Award. She left the NewsHour in 1986, for a job as a producer for West 57th at  CBS News. She also worked as a producer for Face to Face with Connie Chung, America Tonight,  and The CBS Evening News.

In 1991, Cross  joined PBS' Frontline, where she produced eight documentaries. Her first documentary, A Kid Kills, won the Robert F. Kennedy Journalism Award in 1993. In 1996, she co-directed and produced, Secret Daughter, which won a News & Documentary Emmy Award in 1997 and the Alfred I. duPont–Columbia University Award in 1998. A memoir by the same title was published by Viking in 2006.

In 2001, Cross joined the faculty of the Columbia University Graduate School of Journalism, where in 2010, she founded the documentary specialization. She received an honorary degree from Knox College in 2015. Her PBS Frontline documentary, Whose Vote Counts, won a Peabody Award in 2020.

Filmography

Publications 
 2006 - Secret Daughter: A Mixed-Race Daughter and the Mother Who Gave Her Away

Awards and nominations

References

External links
 

Living people
American documentary film directors
American documentary film producers
1954 births
Radcliffe College alumni